Congress of Nigerian University Academics (CONUA) is a secession of Academic Staff Union of Universities. The union is led by  Niyi Sunmonu from Obafemi Awolowo University. It was established in 2018 and was not certified until October 2022 by the Minister of Labour and Employment Senator Chris Ngige  following the failure of the Federal Government of Nigeria and Academic Staff Union of Universities to reach a conclusion that can put an end to the thirty three weeks labour strike that started in February 2022

Founding Members 
The founding members of CONUA are from five universities which are;

 Obafemi Awolowo University (OAU),
 Ambrose Alli University (AAU), Ekpoma

 Federal University, Oye Ekiti (FUOYE); 
 Federal University, Lokoja (FUL) and 
 Kwara State University (KWASU), Molete

References 

Tertiary education trade unions
Trade unions in Nigeria
Education in Nigeria